Box (Roger Bochs) is a fictional superhero appearing in American comic books published by Marvel Comics, specifically Alpha Flight, of which Box was a member. He first appeared in Alpha Flight #1 (Aug. 1983).

Fictional character biography
Roger Bochs was born in Moose Jaw, Saskatchewan. He was a brilliant engineer and mechanic who lost both of his legs. He created a remote-controlled robot which he called Box as a play on his own name. James Hudson saw Bochs' potential. He helped Bochs with the construction of Box and recruited him into Gamma Flight, a training program for the Canadian superhero group Alpha Flight, which was led by Hudson as Guardian. Bochs quickly graduated to Beta Flight, a group for more advanced superhero trainees, but the Canadian government dissolved Alpha Flight, and Beta Flight and Gamma Flight were cancelled. Some members of Beta Flight who were due to be promoted joined Alpha Flight when Heather Hudson contacted them unknowingly.

Later, most Gamma Flight-members were recruited by Jerome Jaxon, a disgraced former employer of Hudson, to join Omega Flight, a criminal organization. Bochs was approached as well and joined Omega Flight, but with the intention to destroy it from within. When Jaxon discovered Bochs' intention, he subdued Bochs and attacked Guardian by manipulating the robot himself by wearing Box's controlling helmet. During the battle, Guardian managed to damage Box, and the feedback killed Jaxon, although the damage sustained during the battle also caused Guardian's suit to explode later.

Bochs returned to work on Box, but he felt partly responsible for Guardian's death. Another friend of Guardian, Madison Jeffries, met Bochs. Collaborating, and because of Jeffries' mutant ability to shape metal, plastic and glass with his mind, they significantly improved upon the original Box design. The improved version was no longer controlled by a helmet. Instead, the user physically merged with the larger and more powerful Box. 

Bochs wanted to use Box to hunt down Delphine Courtney, an android working for Jaxon and the leader of Omega Flight for its part in Hudson's death, but Box was needed elsewhere: The body of Walter Langkowski (alias Sasquatch) had been taken over by the Great Beast Tanaraq, and Snowbird was forced to destroy the body. Alpha Flight managed to project Langkowski's soul into the Box machine. With Alpha Flight, Bochs encountered Courtney once more, who was impersonating Guardian, along with the rest of Omega Flight. Omega was defeated with the assistance of the Beyonder, and Jeffries arrived to use his powers to turn Courtney inside-out, destroying her. Bochs tried to find a new body for him, but failed, and Langkowski's soul left Box. Bochs controlled Box once again and joined Alpha Flight as an official member. 

Bochs and Jeffries used Courtney's remains to reconstruct Guardian's battlesuit, allowing Hudson's widow Heather to become Vindicator. Aurora expressed a romantic interest in Bochs, who returned her affection, but Aurora's fickle nature was extremely stressful for Bochs. During an underwater mission, Bochs surfaced too fast while merged with Box and was suffering from decompression sickness. He was unable to leave Box and started to panic that he could never touch Aurora again. Madison Jeffries' brother Lionel (also known as Scramble), who could shape flesh and bone with his mind, not only separated and healed Bochs from his decompression sickness; he also restored Bochs' legs and gave him an athlete's body. Lionel did not tell Bochs, though, that he had used dead human bodies as material for Bochs' legs and new body. During this time, Langkowski's soul briefly inhabited Box again before ultimately settling in the body of the recently deceased Snowbird. Langkowski had been Aurora's lover before Bochs, and she left Bochs for him again. Bochs was bitter (though he had some amusement when he found out that Langkowski could not use Snowbird's shapeshifting to turn into a male). Feeling betrayed by Aurora and with his legs starting to decompose, Bochs went insane. Madison Jeffries inhabited Box to prevent the amount of damage Bochs could do, but this only increased the sense of betrayal that Bochs felt.

Bochs left Alpha Flight and went to Lionel Jeffries, hoping that he could restore his legs again. Lionel, also insane, merged with Bochs and they formed Omega, who combined Lionel's powers with Bochs' genius intellect. Within Box, Madison Jeffries fought Omega. During the fight, Bochs came to his senses again and started to rebel against Lionel. In the end, Madison was forced to kill Omega, including Bochs.

Powers and abilities
The original Box was a robot which was controlled by a human wearing a special neural interface helmet. The upgraded version of Box is a unique construct: it can't operate on its own and its controller doesn't wear a helmet. He has to phase into Box and merge with it. The controller feels a psychic bond with Box and can feel the damage done to Box as pain. If a person remains merged with Box for too long, he could become bonded to the armor permanently. 
Box has superhuman strength (which was increased with every improvement Roger Bochs and Madison Jeffries made on the armor) and durability. The improved Box also had the ability to fly and had a wide array of sensors and detecting equipment. Both Box robots possess high levels of superhuman strength, with the newer version being considerably stronger.

Other users of Box
 Jerome Jaxon, who stole the controlling helmet of the original Box from Bochs.
 Walter Langkowski aka Sasquatch, who, after the Great Beast Tanaraq took over his body, became a disembodied spirit, which resided in the armor for a short time.
 Madison Jeffries, who completely changed the look of the armor and used his own powers to constantly change and adapt the armor.

References

External links
Box I at AlphaFlight.net
Box III at AlphaFlight.net
Box IV at AlphaFlight.net

Canadian superheroes
Comics characters introduced in 1983
Fictional characters from Saskatchewan
Fictional characters with superhuman durability or invulnerability
Marvel Comics characters with superhuman strength
Marvel Comics robots
Marvel Comics superheroes
Characters created by John Byrne (comics)
Fictional amputees